A tomboy is a girl who behaves according to the gender role of a boy. The term may also refer to:

Films and television
 Tomboy (1936 film), a Chinese film of the 1930s
 Tomboy (1940 film), starring Marcia Mae Jones
 Tomboy (1985 film), a 1985 film starring Betsy Russell
 Tomboy (2008 film), a 2008 animated short film
 Tomboy (2011 film), a 2011 film directed by Céline Sciamma
 Tomboy (2016 film), a 2016 film also known as The Assignment
 Tomboys (film), a 2009 Australian film directed by Nathan Hill

Music
 Tomboy (band), a Japanese pop music band
 Tomboy (album), the 2011 album by the American musician Panda Bear
"Tomboy" (Panda Bear song), a song from the album
 "Tomboy" ((G)I-dle song), 2022
 "Tom Boy", a 1992 song and single by Dutch band Bettie Serveert
 Tomboy, stage name of Thomas Bickham, known for the music video Ok 2 B Gay

Others
 Tomboy (software), an open-source desktop notetaking application
 Tomboy, a 2014 graphic memoir by Liz Prince
 Tomboy, a 1950 novel by Hal Ellson
 Tomboy, Colorado, a ghost town Colorado, United States
 Tomboy stitch or spool knitting, a form of knitting